Duganella zoogloeoides is a bacterium of the genus Duganella in the Oxalobacteraceae family. In a phylogenetic analysis of Zoogloea ramigera, it has been shown to belong to the beta subclass of the class Pseudomonadota which means Z. ramigera should be reclassified as a new taxon name, Duganella zoogloeoides.

References

External links
Type strain of Duganella zoogloeoides at BacDive -  the Bacterial Diversity Metadatabase

Burkholderiales
Bacteria described in 1997